Madhusudan Rao (19 January 1853 – 28 December 1912) was an Odia poet and writer from India. He was known as Bhaktakabi. His most well known work is the Chhabila Madhu Barnabodha.

Life

He was born on 19 January 1853 in the district of Puri. He was a prominent Odia poet and essayist widely considered as the Father Of Modern Odia Poetry, by adding foreign (western) lyrical elements and experimentation. He died on 28 December 1912.

Works
He is known as Bhaktakavi of Odia and is considered the father of modern (using western lyrical forms) Odia poetry.

 In collaboration with Radhanath Ray, he published two volumes, one each in 1873 and 1874, of collections of poems entitled Kavitabali. 

 His other poetry collections, which also consist of compositions used as lyrics for songs, comprise:
 Chhandamala (Vol. 1, 188; Vol. 2, 1895),
 Sangitamala (1894),
 Basanta Gatha (1910),
 Kusumanjali (1903) and
 Utkalgatha (1908).
 Prabandhamala, published in 1880, is a collection of essays in Odia.
 Apart from writing essays, he translated a few works from Sanskrit and English into Odia. They were published in Utkal Darpan, a literary journal.
 He wrote two short stories.
 He translated the Uttararamacarita of Bhavabhuti into Odia.
 He also contributed to children's literature.

References

External links
 

1853 births
1912 deaths
19th-century Indian poets
Poets from Odisha
People from Puri
20th-century Indian poets
Indian male poets
Odia-language poets
Odia-language writers
20th-century Indian male writers
19th-century Indian translators